The demographics of São Paulo City are evidence of a uniquely large and ethnically diverse metropolis, with 111 different ethnic groups. It is the largest city in Brazil with a population defined by a long history of international immigration. São Paulo City is home to more than 11 million people, accounting for about 25% of the population of São Paulo State. Portuguese remains the most widely spoken language and São Paulo is the largest city in the Portuguese speaking world.

Ethnic demographics 
São Paulo demography shows a conglomeration of a large number of ethnic communities. There are European, Arab, Asian, African, Jewish, North American populations in the city. The diversity in the São Paulo demography is due to significant immigration of people from various corners of the world during the 19th and 20th century. The early settlers were people from the southern part of Portugal. The diversity in the demography of São Paulo has led to a variety in its culture, food habits and attire. Its residents are referred to as Paulistanos, while those who reside outside the city, but in the surrounding State of São Paulo, are called Paulistas.

The main ethnics group in São Paulo are the Portuguese followed closely by the Italians. The Metropolitan Region of São Paulo has more people of Italian descent than Rome. São Paulo has had a significant Portuguese population since the 16th century, though most Portuguese arrived in the city and state in the early 20th century. The population of Afro-Brazilian descent in São Paulo has grown in the past few decades, due to strong migration of people from Northeastern Brazil, which has the highest concentration of Brazilians of African descent. The city has the largest Spanish, Arab (mainly Christians of Lebanese or Syrian descent) and Japanese population of the country.

The Immigration Museum is a museum that preserves the history and heritage of immigrants in São Paulo. Located in Brás, a neighborhood whose history is closely associated to the arrival of Italian workers and their families in the late nineteenth century, the museum is located in the old Immigrants' Lodge, built between 1886 and 1888, where newly arrived immigrants could stay for up to eight days before moving on to their final destination in Brazil. The exhibits at the Immigrant Memorial help tell the story of immigration in São Paulo State and in the city of São Paulo through photographs and artifacts. Every year in June, the Immigrantion Museum hosts the Immigrant Festival. More than 30 nationalities participate in the festival, which is held on the Immigrantion Museum patio.

After the first decades of the 20th century, immigration from foreign countries slowed down, but another phenomenon became more and more clear: that of internal migration. Attracted by the prosperity, millions of Brazilians (mostly from the Northeastern States) migrated to the city of São Paulo, lacking education and other skills, the absolute majority ended up working in lower employments, such as civil construction. São Paulo (known, during the 1980s, as the fastest growing city in the world) had many of their sky-scrapers built by the "Nordestinos." The internal migration had cultural impacts. Recent censuses show that São Paulo has more people from the Northeast than most capital cities in Northeastern Brazil.

Population growth 
São Paulo's population has grown rapidly. By 1960 it had surpassed that of Rio de Janeiro, making it Brazil's most populous city. By this time, the urbanized area of São Paulo had extended beyond the boundaries of the municipality proper into neighboring municipalities, making it a metropolitan area with a population of 4.6 million. Population growth has continued since 1960, although the rate of growth has slowed. In 2007 the city's population stood at 10,886,518 and it was estimated that 18.8 million people lived in the urban agglomeration.

Religious demographics 
According to data from 2000, more than half of city residents were identified as Christian; 68.11% of residents are Catholic and 15.94% are Protestant.

See also
 Demographics of Brazil
 Demographics of Rio
 Brazilian Journal of Population Studies

References

Geography of São Paulo
Sao Paulo
São Paulo